Deveau is a surname of French origin, being a cognate of the surname Devaux, which means "from the valleys". Notable people with the surname include:

David Deveau (born 1953), American classical pianist
George R. Deveau (1891-1983), Canadian politician
John Deveau, Canadian politician
Louis Deveau (born 1931), Canadian businessman

See also
Devaux
Deveaux